Franco Reyser (born 14 March 1904, date of death unknown) was an Italian sprinter. He competed in the men's 100 metres at the 1928 Summer Olympics.

References

External links
 

1904 births
Year of death missing
Athletes (track and field) at the 1928 Summer Olympics
Italian male sprinters
Olympic athletes of Italy
Place of birth missing
Italian Athletics Championships winners